Digital learning is any type of learning that is accompanied by technology or by instructional practice that makes effective use of technology. It encompasses the application of a wide spectrum of practices, including blended and virtual learning. Digital learning is sometimes confused with online learning or e-learning; digital learning encompasses the aforementioned concepts.

Digital learning has become widespread during the COVID-19 pandemic.

Overview 
A digital learning strategy may include any of or a combination of any of the following:
 adaptive learning 
 badging and gamification
 blended learning
 classroom technologies
 e-textbooks
 learning analytics
 learning objects
 mobile learning, e.g. mobile phones, tablet computers, laptops, computers.
 personalised learning
 online learning (or e-learning)
 open educational resources (OERs)
 technology-enhanced teaching and learning
 virtual reality
 augmented reality

Through the use of mobile technologies, learning while travelling is possible.

Pedagogies that incorporate digital learning 
Digital learning is meant to enhance the learning experience rather than replace traditional methods altogether. Listed below are common pedagogies, or practices of teaching, that combine technology and learning:

 Blended/hybrid learning
 Online learning
 Flipped learning
 1:1 learning
 Differentiated learning
 Individualized learning
 Personalized learning
 Gamification
 Understanding by Design (UBD)

Pros of Digital Learning 

 Digital learning has many beneficial outcomes, one of which is the student’s ability to work at his/her own pace. With assignments being online students can decide when they want to complete them. If they work best in the morning, they can do them in the morning. On the other hand, if they work best in the evening, they can complete the assignments in the evening. Without having the stress and time limitations of being in a classroom, they can take as long or as little time as they need. This allows them to understand the concept and retain the knowledge fully. 
 Digital learning offers many environmental benefits. Online education relies strictly on digital documents, therefore reducing paper waste and the amount of trees cut down. Studies show that using ebooks as opposed to traditional textbooks would save more than 28,000 trees per million books. Another environmental benefit of digital learning is that it reduces transportation. Completing assignments online as opposed to commuting to class reduces carbon dioxide emissions in the environment by about 148 pounds each semester.

See also 
 Educational technology
 Education and Technology
 Online learning in higher education
 Online credentials for learning
 Digital credential
 Distance education
 MOOC
 Open educational resources
 Educational technology in sub-Saharan Africa

References 

Learning
Educational technology